Munich (German: München) is the capital of the German federal state of Bavaria.

Munich or München may also refer to:

Places
 Munich (district), adjacent to the capital city
 München, a quarter of Bad Berka, Thuringa
 München, a quarter of Hirschbach, Bavaria
 München, a quarter of Hutthurm, Bavaria
 München, a quarter of Uebigau-Wahrenbrück, Brandenburg
 Munich, North Dakota, a city in the United States

Entertainment
 Munich (2005 film), a Steven Spielberg film based on the 1972 Olympic massacre and its aftermath
 Munich – The Edge of War, a 2021 British drama film based on the novel by Robert Harris
 Munich, a 2017 novel by Robert Harris
 "Munich" (song), a 2005 song by British rock group Editors
 "Munich", a 2012 song by the Fray from Scars & Stories
 "Munich", a poem by Patti Smith from her 1978 book Babel

Ships 
 SMS München, a Bremen-class cruiser of the Imperial German Navy
 MS München, a German LASH carrier, lost in a storm in December 1978
 SS General von Steuben, a German luxury passenger ship, renamed from München in 1930

Sports 
 FC Bayern Munich, a sports club located in the capital city
 TSV 1860 Munich, a sports club also known for its football team
 Munich (sport shoes), a Spanish company and brand specialized in sports and fashion shoes

Other
 Munich, a common shorthand for Munich Agreement, the 1938 accord ceding the Sudetenland to Germany
 Munich Group is a diplomatic initiative in the Middle East
 Alphonse Munchen (1850–1917), engineer and politician from Luxembourg
 Munich air disaster, the crash of an aircraft carrying British footballers at Munich-Riem Airport in 1958
 Munich putsch 1923, also known as Hitler's Beer Hall Putsch
 Munich massacre, a 1972 Palestine Liberation Organization terrorist attack against Israeli athletes at the Olympics
 Munich Security Conference, an international political forum

See also 
 Mnichov (disambiguation)
 Monaco (disambiguation)